Chandra Shekhar Dubey (born 2 January 1946) also known as Dadai Dubey was a Cabinet minister in Jharkhand government. He was an elected MLA of Bishrampur (Vidhan Sabha constituency). Dadai Dubey is a member of the Indian National Congress political party. Chandrashekhar Dubey was also member of the 14th Lok Sabha of India. He represented the Dhanbad constituency of Jharkhand. Chandrashekhar Dubey was made the state rural development minister in Jharkhand in Hemant Soren government in August 2013. Dubey was also the general secretary of Rashtiya Koyla Mazdoor Sangh affiliated to INTUC. Chandrashekhar Dubey was also a senate member of Nilamber Pitamber University, nominated by Hon'ble Speaker of Jharkhand Legislative Assembly. In July 2015, Dadai Dubey was arrested for misbehaving with the police and was sent to judicial custody.

Political career
 1970–77 – Mukhia
 1977-2009 -Representative, Indian National Trade Union Congress
 1985–2000 -Member, Bihar Legislative Assembly (Three Terms)
 2000– Minister of Labour and Employment in Rabri Devi government in Bihar
 2000–2004 BC- Member, Jharkhand Legislative Assembly
 2004 -Elected to 14th Lok Sabha, Member from Dhanbad, Committee on Coal and Steel, Member- Consultative Committee on Coal & Mines 
 5 Aug. 2007 onwards- Member, Standing Committee on Coal 
 2013– MLA, Bishrampur (Vidhan Sabha constituency), Jharkhand; Cabinet Minister, Jharkhand- Gram Vikas, Panchayati raj, Labour and Employment.

Dismissal

Dadai Dubai was terminated from ministry for raising his voice against involvement of Chief Minister in various scams, transfer-posting of officials in the state. He was quoted "Chief Minister Hemant Soren lacks political will to eliminate poverty, corruption and terrorism from the state". He was disappointed with Jharkhand Congress, to continue his fight against corruption and social injustice in Jharkhand.

References

External links
 Jharkhand Cabinet
 District Election Office, Palamu

1946 births
Living people
India MPs 2004–2009
Indian National Congress politicians from Jharkhand
People from Dhanbad district
People from Garhwa district
Jharkhand MLAs 2000–2005
Lok Sabha members from Jharkhand
Trinamool Congress politicians
Bihar MLAs 1985–1990
Bihar MLAs 1990–1995
Bihar MLAs 1995–2000